Asante, also known as Ashanti, Ashante, or Asante Twi, is one of the principal members of the Akan dialect continuum. It is one of the four mutually intelligible dialects of Akan which are collectively known as Twi, the others being Bono and Akuapem. There are 3.8 million speakers of Asante, mainly concentrated in Ghana and southeastern Cote D'Ivoire, and especially in and around the Ashanti Region of Ghana.

Writing system 
The Ashanti used Adinkra in their daily lives. Adinkra Nkyea is a writing system based on the Adinkra symbols. The Akan language and its dialects use the Adinkra Nkyea writing system. The majority of Adinkra Nkyea is derived from the original Adinkra symbols. Adinkra Nkyea contains some 39 characters, 10 numerals, and three punctuation marks.

References 

Ashanti people
Akan
Akan language